Defence Laboratory, located in Jodhpur, is a strategically important laboratory of the Defence Research and Development Organisation.

Previously located in Ratanada Palace (now a DRTC training centre), it was moved to the New Technical Complex. It is responsible for the development and manufacture of electronics and materials required for modern warfare and weapon systems. Its main research fields are materials and electronics. Its mission is development of radio communication systems, data links, satellite communication systems, millimeter wave communication systems.

The Defence Laboratory, Jodhpur has developed several nuclear radiation monitoring systems, indigenous CHAFF Technology and camouflage techniques for the Armed Forces of India.

Jodhpur
Defence Research and Development Organisation
Science and technology in Rajasthan
Research institutes established in 1959
1959 establishments in Rajasthan